Grob's Attack is an unconventional chess opening in which White begins with the move:
1. g4

It is widely considered to be one of the worst possible first moves for White. International Master (IM) John Watson writes, "As far as I can tell, 1 g4 is competitive with 1 h4 for the honour of being White's worst first move. Against an informed or skilled opponent, it is simply masochistic."

History and usage
The opening takes its name from Swiss IM Henri Grob (1904–1974) who analysed it extensively and played hundreds of correspondence games with it. In Grob's newspaper column analysis of this opening, he referred to it as the Spike Opening, a name which is still used occasionally. Other early references used the name Ahlhausen's Opening, after Carl Ahlhausen (1835–1892) of Berlin, one of the first to play 1.g4.  Savielly Tartakower sometimes played this opening in simultaneous exhibitions and called it the Genoa or San Pier D'Arena Opening, after the city and suburb of Genoa where he first used it.  In the Czech Republic and Slovakia, 1.g4 is called Fric's Opening, and in other parts of the world it is called Kolibri's Opening. 

Along with several other uncommon first moves for White, the Grob is classified under the code A00 ("irregular openings" or "uncommon openings") in the Encyclopedia of Chess Openings. White has three main plans: to support the g4 pawn with h3; pressure against d5 or on the h1–a8 diagonal, preventing Black from playing ...Bxg4 (e.g. 1.g4 d5 2.Bg2 Bxg4 3.c4, exploiting the pin against the b7-pawn); or advancing the h-pawn in a  attack.

Perhaps the highest-profile game to feature the Grob was when Michael Basman defeated grandmaster and renowned theorist John Nunn with it in 1978. The Grob was also forced upon Anatoly Karpov by former Soviet premier Mikhail Gorbachev in a friendly match against Susan Polgar in Lindsborg, Kansas 2005. Gorbachev made the ceremonial first move and played 1.g4. Normally players can simply retract ceremonial moves they do not like. In this case Gorbachev insisted Karpov play on, saying he wanted to "cause some difficulties for the older player."

The Grob was included in the opening book for the superfinal of the 12th Top Chess Engine Championship season (April–July 2018). Both finalists, Stockfish and Komodo, evaluated the position after 1.g4 as providing a clear advantage for Black, and both failed to defend the White position.

Responses
IM Michael Basman and Grandmaster Spyridon Skembris are advocates of the opening. It has a certain surprise value, and the average player is unlikely to know how to refute it and more likely to get overconfident and make mistakes. Moreover, the lack of theory along this line may negate the repertoire of an experienced opponent. Intuitive play by  Black can lead into dangerous traps.  Many of these traps rely on Black's replying with 1...d5, attacking the pawn with his . White can sacrifice the pawn with 2.Bg2 Bxg4 3.c4 with Qb3 to follow, giving White some pressure against the weakened squares d5 and b7.

	

Black is not obliged to give White these opportunities. In response to Grob's Attack, Black may also play 1...e5. Good responses would be 2.Bg2 (dominating the light-squared centre diagonal) or 2.c4, the English Variation, preparing Nc3 to solidify White's control of d5. After 1...e5, Black can take aim at the h4-square, left weak by White's pawn advance.  2.Bg2 h5 will force a weakening of White's pawn structure. 2.d3 (intending to answer 2...h5 with 3.g5) or 2.h3 can be answered by 2...Ne7 with the threat of ...Ng6 followed by ...Nf4 or ...Nh4, disrupting White's kingside fianchetto.

Another frequently used setup for White in the Grob is 1.g4, 2.h3, and 3.Bg2. A Black counter-setup might be 1...d5, 2...e5, and 3...c6 (these moves may be played in any order), which, if used in conjunction with an eventual ...e4, negates White's 's influence over the centre.

A key element of the Grob is deploying the king's bishop on g2 and having it rule the diagonal. In order to further this goal, White must keep the centre clear of pawns. This leads to frequent "tearing at the centre" with c4 often being White's third move.

Due to the unusual pawn structure White attains by playing g4 and c4 so early in the game, there is frequently little advantage to castling. Play often devolves into a wild and wide-open game, with a definitive advantage usually resolving itself in the first 20 moves.

Borg Defense
Black responding to any opening move by White with 1...g5 is called the "Borg Defence", Borg being the reverse spelling of Grob. If played specifically in response to 1.e4, it is also called the Basman Defence, after Michael Basman.

See also
 List of chess openings
 List of chess openings named after people
 Irregular chess openings

References

Bibliography

Chess openings

pl:Nieregularne otwarcie#1.g4 – atak Groba